Bianchi International of Temecula, California is a worldwide producer of leather and nylon goods for the law enforcement industry.  Since the 1970s they have produced items from gun holsters to duty belts and everything related in between.

Armor Holdings bought Bianchi International in 2004; BAE Systems bought Armor in 2007.

John Bianchi, the founder of Bianchi International, was working together with his colleague, Neale Perkins, who later established his own company, "Safariland". Bianchi's right-hand man was Richard Nichols, a talented designer who was instrumental in the design and development of most of the company's products for over twenty years. Both companies have since become major suppliers of law enforcement equipment.

Warren B. Kanders and the management team of Safariland acquired Safariland from BAE Systems for approximately $124 million in July 2012.

See also
 The Bianchi Cup
 Police duty belt
 Sam Browne Belt

References

External links
 http://www.bianchi-intl.com/ - Bianchi International

Handgun holsters
Manufacturing in Riverside County, California
Temecula, California
BAE Systems subsidiaries and divisions